Alexander Perry (born 4 March 1998) is an English footballer who plays as a midfielder for Hyde United.

Career
Perry came through Bolton's academy and made his debut for the team on 30 August 2016 when he started in a 2-0 home loss against Everton U-23s in the Football League Trophy Group Stage.

Perry joined Evo Stik Northern Premier club Sutton Coldfield on a month's loan on 28 October 2017.

He left Bolton on a free transfer at the end of the 2017–18 season following the expiry of his contract.

Wigan Athletic
In September 2018, he moved to Wigan Athletic, where he initially linked up with the club's development squad.

Scunthorpe United
Following his release from Wigan, he signed for EFL League Two Scunthorpe United on a two-year deal.

Career statistics

References

External links

1998 births
Living people
Footballers from Liverpool
English footballers
Association football midfielders
Bolton Wanderers F.C. players
Sutton Coldfield Town F.C. players
Wigan Athletic F.C. players
Scunthorpe United F.C. players
English Football League players
Northern Premier League players